Pyar Ke Kabil is a 1987 Indian Bollywood film directed by Anil Ganguly and produced by Suresh Grover. It stars Rishi Kapoor and Padmini Kolhapure in lead roles, with Bindu, Utpal Dutt and Deven Verma in supporting roles. It is a loose copy of 1968 film Do Kaliyan, starring Biswajeet and Mala Sinha.

Cast
 Rishi Kapoor ... Amar Kapoor
 Padmini Kolhapure ... Sangeeta Kapoor
 Bindu ... Rukmani
 Utpal Dutt ... Rukmini's Husband
 Deven Verma ... Nandkishore Govardhan
 Tiku Talsania 
 Gulshan Grover ... Kallu Kalan Kaalia "Kalidas"
 Asha Sachdev ... Chanchal (Dance Teacher)
 Shubha Khote ... Komal (Chanchal's Mother)

Soundtrack
Lyrics: Indeevar

"Red Light, No Green Light" and "Tere Jaisa Mukhda To", nicely sung by Kishore Kumar, remain popular.

References

External links

1980s Hindi-language films
1987 films
Films scored by Bappi Lahiri
Films directed by Anil Ganguly